The 2018–19 Sunshine Tour was the 19th season of professional golf tournaments since the southern Africa-based Sunshine Tour was relaunched in 2000. The Sunshine Tour represents the highest level of competition for male professional golfers in the region.

The tour is based predominantly in South Africa with other events being held in Zimbabwe, Eswatini, Zambia, Mauritius and Kenya.

Schedule
The following table lists official events during the 2018–19 season.

Order of Merit
The Order of Merit was based on prize money won during the season, calculated in South African rand.

Notes

References

External links

Sunshine Tour
Sunshine Tour
Sunshine Tour